Rev. Brian F. Linnane, S.J. (born August 25, 1955) is the former president of Loyola University Maryland. Before assuming the presidency, he served as an assistant dean and associate professor at College of the Holy Cross, a Jesuit institution in Worcester, Massachusetts.

Early life and education
Born August 25, 1955, Fr. Linnane entered the Society of Jesus in 1977 and was ordained to the Roman Catholic priesthood on June 14, 1986. He earned an A.B. degree, magna cum laude, from Boston College in 1977 and an M.A. in government from Georgetown University in 1981 before undertaking divinity studies at the  Jesuit School of Theology at Berkeley, where he received an M.Div. in 1986 and an S.T.L. in 1988. He earned an M.A. in 1990, an M.Phil. in 1991, and a Ph.D. in 1994 in religious studies from Yale University. He received an honorary doctorate from Loyola University Maryland in 2015.

College of the Holy Cross
Fr. Linnane joined the Religious Studies department at Holy Cross in 1994. He has written several scholarly articles in the disciplines of fundamental moral theology, health care ethics, and virtue ethics. He served as assistant dean at Holy Cross from 2003–05 and was named a Loyola College Trustee in 2000.

Loyola University
In July 2005, Fr. Linnane became the 24th President of Loyola University Maryland. As president of Loyola University Maryland, Fr. Linnane has overseen the opening of the Ridley Athletic Complex as well as renovation and expansion of Donnelly Science Center, the building of Thea Bowman Hall, the expansion and renovation of Loyola/Notre Dame Library, the opening of the McClure Tennis Center, and the groundbreaking for the Miguel B. Fernandez Family Center for Innovation and Collaborative Learning, which opened in Fall 2021. He steered the University through the strategic plan, Grounded in Tradition, Educating for the Future and led Loyola through its designation change from Loyola College in Maryland to Loyola University Maryland in 2009. He launched and completed Loyola's first comprehensive fundraising campaign, Bright Minds, Bold Hearts, and he provided and inspired the vision for Messina, Loyola's distinctive living learning program. He was also known for encouraging students to "squeeze the sponge dry," referring to trying to making the most of your college experience academically and co-curricularly.

Fr. Linnane currently serves on the board of trustees for Marquette University; University of Detroit Mercy; and the Institute of Christian and Jewish Studies. Fr. Linnane retired from the presidency at Loyola University Maryland on June 30, 2021. He has been named President Emeritus at Loyola.

References

1955 births
Living people
Presidents of Loyola University Maryland
Boston College alumni
Georgetown University Graduate School of Arts and Sciences alumni
20th-century American Jesuits
21st-century American Jesuits
People from Massachusetts
Yale University alumni
Jesuit School of Theology at Berkeley alumni